Heidi Long (born 29 November 1996) is a British rower. She won a gold medal in the coxless four at the 2022 European Rowing Championships and the 2022 World Rowing Championships.

References

External links

1996 births
Living people
British female rowers
European Rowing Championships medalists
World Rowing Championships medalists for Great Britain
21st-century British women